Julian Phillips (born November 5, 2003) is an American college basketball player for the Tennessee Volunteers of the Southeastern Conference.

Early life and high school
Phillips was born in Killeen, Texas and moved to Columbia, South Carolina in the third grade after his parents, who were serving in the U.S. Army, were stationed at Fort Jackson. He initially attended Blythewood High School in Blythewood, South Carolina. Phillips transferred to Link Prep in Branson, Missouri after his junior year. He played in the 2022 McDonald's All-American Boys Game during his senior year.

Phillips was a consensus five-star recruit and one of the top 20 players in the 2022 class, according to major recruiting services. He originally committed to play college basketball at LSU over offers from Florida State, Tennessee, and USC at the beginning of his senior season and signed a National Letter of Intent (NLI) during the early signing period. After LSU head coach Will Wade was fired, Phillips requested and was granted a release from his NLI and reopened his recruitment. He ultimately committed to play at Tennessee after considering offers from South Carolina and Auburn. Phillips also considered playing professionally in the NBA G League.

College career
Phillips entered his freshman season at Tennessee as the Volunteers' starting small forward. He was named to the 2022 Battle 4 Atlantis All-Tournament team after averaging a team-leading 13.3 points per game.

References

External links
Tennessee Volunteers bio

2003 births
Living people
American men's basketball players
Basketball players from South Carolina
Small forwards
Tennessee Volunteers basketball players
McDonald's High School All-Americans